"The Gap" is a song by the British pop group Thompson Twins. It was the title track from the group's 1984 album Into the Gap, and was also released as a single in certain countries though not in the group's native UK. The single peaked at #69 in the U.S., spending six weeks on the US Billboard 100. It also charted in Germany where it peaked at #62. There was no promotional music video for this single.

The B-sides are a "megamix" of various Thompson Twins songs titled "Out Of The Gap", and the previous single, "Sister Of Mercy" (LP Version).

Formats
7" U.S. vinyl single (Arista AS1-9290)
"The Gap" - 3:53
"Out Of The Gap" (Medley) - 5:53

12" European vinyl single (Arista 601 365)
"The Gap" (Extended Version) - 8:34
"Sister Of Mercy" (LP Version) - 5:08 (mislabeled as Extended Version)
"Out Of The Gap" (Medley) - 5:53

7" German vinyl single (Ariola 106 591)
"The Gap" - 3:53
"Sister Of Mercy" - 5:08

12" U.S. vinyl promo single (Arista ADP-9289) 
"The Gap" (AOR Version) - 3:53
"The Gap" (Club Remix Version) - 8:34

7" U.S. vinyl promo single (Arista AS1-9290-SA)
"The Gap" - 3:53
"The Gap" - 3:53

Chart performance

Official versions

Personnel 
Written by  Tom Bailey, Alannah Currie, and Joe Leeway.
Tom Bailey – vocals, synthesizer, contrabass, guitar, drum programmes
Alannah Currie – lyrics, marimba, xylophone, backing vocals, percussion
Joe Leeway – backing vocals, congas, Prophet V
Dinesh Pandit – tablas on "The Gap"
 Produced by Alex Sadkin with Tom Bailey 
 Recorded and mixed by Phil Thornalley
 "Out Of The Gap" mixed by The Swedish Eagle & Chris Modig ("In The Name Of Love" produced by Steve Lillywhite)
 Photography – Paul Cox
 Artwork/Design – Andie Airfix, Satori
 Art Direction – Alannah and Nick Marchant

References

1984 singles
Thompson Twins songs
Songs written by Alannah Currie
Songs written by Tom Bailey (musician)
Songs written by Joe Leeway
1983 songs
Arista Records singles